Armageddon is the tenth studio album by Aria, and the first after signing to the CD-Maximum label.

Track #8 "Chuzhoy" reached the 1st position on the Russian radio charts.

It was the last album of the band to feature Artur Berkut on its line-up.

Track listing

Lyric themes
"Strazh imperii" tells about Japanese kamikaze in World War II
"Novy krestovy pokhod" is sung from the point of Knight Templar
"Messiya" tells of the struggle between Christianity and Slavic Paganism
"Krov koroley" tells the story of the last battle of King Arthur
"Chuzhoy" is based on Ray Bradbury's short story "Zero Hour"
"Posledny zakat" deals with World War III and nuclear war

Personnel
 Arthur Berkut – Vocals
 Vladimir Holstinin – Guitar
 Vitaly Dubinin – Bass
 Sergey Popov – Guitar
 Maxim Udalov – Drums

Recorded on ARIA Records studio. Sound engineering by Dmitry Kalinin. Mastering by Andrey Subbotin and Saturday Mastering studio.
Technical support by A&T Trade, Avallon, Mixart, Violet Design. Instruments by: Fender, Jackson, Ibanez, Marshall Amplifiers, DiMarzio, Korg, Shure, Dean Markley, Sabine, Tama, Zildjian, Violet Design.

Cover art by Leo Hao.

References 

2006 albums
Aria (band) albums